Edward Joseph Costello (13 October 1887 – 25 April 1916) was one of two people from the geographical area now known as Northern Ireland to be killed in the 1916 Easter Rising in Ireland.

Biography
Costello was born in Lurgan, County Armagh to Edward (snr) and Rose Costello. His parents came to Lurgan from Kilcock, County Kildare to work in a family business which was in the town centre.

Edward Joseph worked as a clerk in Johnston and Allen's Linen Manufacturers in Victoria Street, Lurgan.  He married Annie and lived in number 3 Castle Lane Lurgan. In 1914 he left Lurgan to seek employment in Dublin. His death certificate lists his final occupation as a pawn broker's assistant.

He joined the Irish Citizen Army in 1915. His wife Annie remained in Lurgan. He made frequent visits back to the town to see his wife and children.

He took part in the Easter Rising in April 1916, and received a fatal bullet wound to the head on 25 April, dying later in Jervis Street Hospital. He was aged 27 years. His brother James registered the death. He was buried in Glasnevin Cemetery  on 1 May 1916. His grave is in the St, Paul's section, DC 30. At present there is no headstone on his grave.

His widow remained in Lurgan and raised his children in the town. They moved from Castle Lane in the 1950s, moving to number 1 Antrim Road Lurgan. His widow Annie Costello died in Lurgan on 22 March 1959.

In 2016 there was controversy in Lurgan about the building of a memorial to him.

References

External links
http://homepages.iol.ie/~dluby/history.htm
http://irishmedals.org/gpage41.html

People of the Easter Rising
People from Lurgan
1916 deaths
Deaths by firearm in the Republic of Ireland
1887 births
Irish Citizen Army members